An eyepatch is a small patch that is worn in front of one eye. It may be a cloth patch attached around the head by an elastic band or by a string, an adhesive bandage, or a plastic device which is clipped to a pair of glasses. It is often worn by people to cover a lost or injured eye, but it also has a therapeutic use in children for the treatment of amblyopia. Eyepatches used to block light while sleeping are referred to as a sleep mask.

An eyepad or eye pad is a soft medical dressing that can be applied over an eye to protect it. It is not necessarily the same as an eyepatch.

History
In the years before advanced medicine and surgery, eyepatches were common for people who had a lost or injured eye. They were particularly prevalent among members of dangerous occupations, such as soldiers and sailors who could lose an eye in battle.  While stereotypically associated with pirates, there is no evidence to suggest the historical accuracy of eye patch wearing pirates before several popular novels of the 19th century (see Association with pirates below).

Medical uses

Amblyopia
Eye patching is used in the orthoptic management of children at risk of lazy eye (amblyopia), especially strabismic or anisometropic amblyopia.  These conditions can cause visual suppression of areas of the dissimilar images by the brain such as to avoid diplopia, resulting in a loss of visual acuity in the suppressed eye and in extreme cases in blindness in an otherwise functional eye. Patching the good eye forces the amblyopic eye to function, thereby causing vision in that eye to be retained. It is important to perform "near activities" (such as reading or handiwork) when patched, thereby exercising active, attentive vision.

A study provided evidence that children treated for amblyopia with eye patching had lower self-perception of social acceptance. To prevent a child from being socially marginalized by their peers due to wearing an eye patch, atropine eye drops may be used instead. This induces temporary blurring in the treated eye.

It has been pointed out that the penalization of one eye by means of patching or atropine drops does not provide the necessary conditions to develop or improve binocular vision. Recently, efforts have been made to propose alternative treatments of amblyopia that do allow for the improvement of binocular sight, for example, using binasal occlusion or partially frosted spectacles in place of any eye patch, using alternating occlusion goggles or using methods of perceptual learning based on video games or virtual reality games for enhancing binocular vision.

A 2014 Cochrane Review sought to determine the effectiveness of occlusion treatment on patients with sensory deprivation amblyopia, however no trials were found eligible to be included in the review. However, it is suggested that good outcomes from occlusion treatment for sensory deprivation amblyopia rely on compliance with the treatment.

Extraocular muscle palsy
To initially relieve double vision (diplopia) caused by an extra-ocular muscle palsy, an eye care professional may recommend using an eyepatch. This can help to relieve the dizziness, vertigo and nausea that are associated with this form of double vision.

Use by aircraft pilots
Aircraft pilots used an eye patch, or close one eye to preserve night vision when there was disparity in the light intensity within or outside their aircraft, such as when flying at night over brightly lit cities, so that one eye could look out, and the other would be adjusted for the dim lighting of the cockpit to read unlit instruments and maps.  Some military pilots have worn a lead-lined or gold-lined eyepatch, to protect against blindness in both eyes, in the event of a nuclear blast or laser weapon attack.

Eyepatches are not currently used by military personnel; modern technology has provided an array of other means to preserve and enhance night vision, including red-light and low-level white lights, and night vision devices.

Association with pirates

Rahmah ibn Jabir al-Jalahimah, once the most popular pirate in the Persian Gulf, was also the first known to wear an eyepatch after losing an eye in battle. Ex-sailors, ashore, were sometimes portrayed as having an eyepatch to cover the loss of an eye.

Medical texts have referred to the eye patch as a "pirate's patch" and, writing in the Minnesota Academy of Sciences Journal in 1934, Charles Sheard of the Mayo foundation pointed out that by "wearing a patch (The pirate's patch) over one eye, it will keep the covered eye in a state of readiness and adaptation for night vision". This technique was explored during WWII by institutes such as the United States Navy. The proposal that pirates may have worn an eyepatch so that one eye would be pre-adjusted to below-deck darkness was tested in an episode of MythBusters in 2007 and found to be plausible, but without any recorded historical precedent.

Notable wearers

 Sir Adrian Carton de Wiart
 Ana de Mendoza
 André De Toth
 Andrew Vachss
 Barbara Boggs Sigmund
 Bobby Helms
 Bruce Peterson
 Bushwick Bill
 Charles H. Bonesteel III
 Charles Stourton, 26th Baron Mowbray
 Claus von Stauffenberg
 Dale Chihuly
 Dale D. Myers
 Dan Crenshaw
 Date Masamune.
 David Bowie
 Dick Curless
 Dušan Prelević
 Floyd Gibbons
 Francisco de Orellana
 François Coli
 Fritz Lang
 Gabrielle
 George Maciunas
 George Melly
 Jack Coggins
 James Joyce
 Jan Syrový
 Jan Žižka
 Jason Trost
 John Ford
 José Millán Astray
 Lewis Williams Douglas
 Lisa Lopes
 Luís de Camões
 María de Villota
 Marie Colvin
 Martin Bayerle
 Maxie Anderson
 Momus
 Moshe Dayan
 Mother Angelica
 Nicholas Ray
 Nick Popaditch
 Nicolas-Jacques Conté
 Pete Burns
 Peter Gatien
 Rahmah ibn Jabir al-Jalahimah
 Raoul Walsh
 Ray Sawyer
 Richard Tesařík
 Richard W. Rahn
 Rich Williams
 Ron Hamilton
 Salman Rushdie
 Sammy Davis Jr.
 Sheila Gish
 Sir Francis Bryan
 Slick Rick
 Victor Page
 Wiley Post

In fiction
An eyepatch can be used in fiction to lend an additional dimension to a character, an air of mystery or general je ne sais quoi.

 Vanica Zogratis (Black Clover)
 The Demoman (Team Fortress 2)
 Danger Mouse
 Nick Fury (Marvel Comics)
 Ultimate Nick Fury (Marvel Comics)
 Deathstroke (DC Comics)
 Nick Fury Jr (Marvel Comics)
 Aemond "One-Eye" Targaryen (A Song of Ice and Fire/House of the Dragon)
The Governor (The Walking Dead)
Bazooka Joe
 General Chang (Star Trek VI: The Undiscovered Country)
 Rooster Cogburn
 Asuka Langley Shikinami (Rebuild of Evangelion)
 Elle Driver (Kill Bill: Volume 1)
 Kenpachi Zaraki (Bleach)
 Goro Majima (Yakuza)
 Franky (Sky Captain and the World of Tomorrow)
 Madame Kovarian
 Emilio Largo
 Snake Plissken
 Oberst Radl (The Eagle Has Landed)
 Ribouldingue from Les Pieds Nickelés
 Ziggy Stardust
 Saul Tigh
 Big Dan Teague (Oh Brother, Where Art Thou?)
 Big Boss/Venom Snake/Solidus Snake (Metal Gear)
 Catalina Creel (Cuna de Lobos)
 Lockon Stratos (Mobile Suit Gundam 00)
 Valmet (Jormungand)
 Xigbar/Braig (Kingdom Hearts)
 Ken Cosgrove (Mad Men) 
 Carl Grimes (The Walking Dead)
 Sean Diaz (Life Is Strange 2)
Sagat (Street Fighter)
 Dimitri Alexandre Blaiddyd (Fire Emblem: Three Houses)
 Ana Amari (Overwatch)
 Ethan Nakamura (Percy Jackson & the Olympians)
 Undyne (Undertale)
 Thor (Marvel Cinematic Universe)
 Odin (Marvel Cinematic Universe)
 Modo (Biker Mice from Mars)
 Kaeya Alberich (Genshin Impact)
 Beidou (Genshin Impact)
 Fischl (Genshin Impact)
 Basil St. John (Brenda Starr, Reporter)
 Sally Brown
 The "Hathaway Man" advertising character
 Number 2 (Austin Powers)
 Steve Johnson (Days of Our Lives)

See also 
 Orthoptist
 Blindfold
 Haploscope
 Diplopia
 Domino mask
 Binocular vision
 Stereopsis

References

External links
 
 International Orthoptic Association

Eyewear
Ophthalmology
Medical equipment
Maritime culture